Dwarika's Hotel is a luxury hotel in Kathmandu, Nepal. It is located in the Battisputali neighborhood. The hotel is a collection of various traditional heritage Nepali houses that congregate around courtyards and is considered one of Asia's finest hotels. The hotel has 80-rooms, 48 suites and took over 30 years to construct, it has won the UNESCO Asia-Pacific Heritage Award for Culture Heritage Conservation

History

The hotel is known for its efforts in cultural preservation. It started when founder Dwarika Das Shrestha decided to save old wood carvings from traditional Kathmandu buildings that were about to be thrown away. In 1952, Shrestha saw carpenters cutting up an intricately carved wooden pillar of a demolished old building, to use it as firewood. This inspired his lifelong effort to save and reuse these historic carvings. Later put into a room that housed a single masters student from abroad, the carvings garnered such interest that Shrestha found the idea of constructing guest rooms with traditional wood carvings, and thus began the hotel venture. Shrestha also revived the technique of "Dacchiapa," the Newari traditional method of making carved bricks. Shrestha died in 1992.

The hotel is still managed by the Shrestha family, and now possesses a large private woodwork collection. The restoration workshop that the late Dwarika Shrestha established in order to revive wood carvings as early as 1962 is still in operation, although only used for significantly damaged pieces

Reception

"The simple, Nepali-style brick building embellished with decorative woodcarvings opened in 1977. For years, its owner, the late Dwarika Das Shrestha, who was also a visionary conservationist, rescued thousands of ancient carved wooden pieces, then employed traditionally trained Nepali craftsmen to integrate them into an atmospheric, ancient looking haven, a virtual oasis in a very busy city."

"The hotel consists of three main brick-built buildings, which are finished with traditional and mostly historic wood window frames salvaged from demolished buildings. They’re set round a series of linked paved courtyards, which are blissfully peaceful and atmospheric, and dotted with trees and shrines."

". . . a truly unique hotel that not only delights foreign visitors but also constitutes a living model for other Nepalese who wish to create similar works of art."

"Often described as a 'living museum,' this family-run five-star hotel has become a savior of Newari crafts and architecture".

References

External links 
 
 Photographs

Hotels in Kathmandu